Facundo Labandeira Castro (born 3 March 1996) is a Uruguayan professional footballer who plays as a forward for Sport Recife, on loan from Defensor Sporting.

References

External links
Profile at Nacional Official Website

1996 births
Living people
Club Nacional de Football players
C.A. Progreso players
Danubio F.C. players
Uruguayan Primera División players
Uruguayan footballers
Association football forwards
People from Florida Department